Habib Saher (b. 1903 in Mianeh, Eastern Azerbaijan — d. 1988 in Tehran), was an Iranian poet of Azerbaijani people, Habib wrote—including his poems—in Azerbaijani, Persian and French languages.

References

External links
 Həbib Sahir. Seçilmiş əsərləri. Baku, "Lider", 2005. 192 səh.
 Habib Saher

1903 births
People from Mianeh
1988 deaths
Azerbaijani-language poets
20th-century Iranian poets